Safaa Mohammed Ali (1982-November 9, 2005) was an Iraqi militant who carried out the 2005 Amman bombings. He has been also referred to as one of the Al-Qaeda members who planned the 9/11 bombing on The Pentagon and the Twin Towers. He is also associated with a planned attack on the White House.

He was captured in November 2004 by U.S. forces during the battle of Fallujah and he was released two weeks later because his captors failed to identify him as a combatant. Nearly a year later he detonated a suicide vest and murder 57 people in a wedding party in Amman, Jordan.

References

Iraqi al-Qaeda members
1982 births
2005 deaths